The 1939–40 Coppa Italia was the 7th Coppa Italia, the major Italian domestic cup. The competition was won by Fiorentina.

Serie C elimination round 

Replay matches

* Siracusa qualify after drawing of lots.

First round 
6 clubs are added (Valpolcevera, Pistoiese, Juventus Siderno, Manfredonia, Cagliari, GIL Terranova).

Replay matches

Second round 

Replay match

Serie B elimination round

Third round 
16 Serie B clubs are added (Hellas Verona, Vigevano, Atalanta, Brescia, Pro Vercelli, Sanremese, Alessandria, Lucchese, Livorno, Catania, Siena, Pisa, Anconitana-Bianchi, Molinella, Juventina Palermo, Fanfulla).

Replay matches

Round of 32 
16 Serie A clubs are added (Novara, Milano, Fiorentina, Triestina, Lazio, Roma, Juventus, Ambrosiana-Inter, Torino, Modena, Venezia, Napoli, Genova 1893, Bari, Bologna, Liguria).

Replay match

Round of 16 

Replay match

Quarter-finals

Semi-finals

Final

Top goalscorers

References

External links
rsssf.com

Coppa Italia seasons
1939–40 domestic association football cups
Coppa